Medieval stained glass is the coloured and painted glass of medieval Europe from the 10th century to the 16th century. For much of this period stained glass windows were the major pictorial art form, particularly in northern France, Germany and England, where windows tended to be larger than in southern Europe (in Italy, for example, frescos were more common). In some countries, such as Sweden and England, only a small number of original stained windows has survived to this day.

Stained glass windows were used predominantly in churches, but were also found in wealthy domestic settings and public buildings such as town halls, though surviving examples of secular glass are very rare indeed. Stained glass windows were used in churches to enhance their beauty and to inform the viewer through narrative or symbolism. The subject matter was generally religious in churches, though "portraits" and heraldry were often included, and many narrative scenes give valuable insights into the medieval world.

History

Early stained glass 

Window glass was in use from at least the 1st century AD and colored and painted window glass for use in religious buildings was also manufactured at an early date. The earliest extant example of ecclesiastical stained glass is possibly that from Basilica of San Vitale in Ravenna, Italy—a clear glass roundel with a depiction of Christ in Majesty, thought to be from the 6th century.

Some of the earliest known examples of colored window glass, datable to c. 800–820, were recovered in excavations at the Abbey of San Vicenzo in Volturno, Italy. Glass of the same colour ranges and similar date has also been found in England, at the monastic sites of Jarrow and Monkwearmouth, and at other sites in the north of England. These examples are not painted. However, it was not until the advent of the monumental cathedral and church building campaigns in the 11th and 12th centuries that the demand for colored glass began to increase significantly, reaching its highest level in the 14th and 15th centuries. The oldest surviving glass windows still in situ are thought to be the Prophet Windows in Augsburg Cathedral, of c. 1065.

A useful 12th-century source on medieval glass manufacture is the De diversis artibus ("On various arts") of Theophilus Presbyter, a Benedictine monk believed by some scholars to be Roger of Helmarshausen, a metal glass and pigment worker of the late 11th and early 12th centuries. It describes a number of craft processes, including glassmaking and glassworking.

In the 9th century or earlier (books 1 and 2 of a 3-vol Mss. completed by another in the 12th, Heraclius, in De coloribus et artibus Romanorum ("Of Hues and Crafts of the Romans"), gives an account of methods for producing colored glass, although he may have copied much of his text from the Natural History of Pliny the Elder of c. 77 AD. Now considered "inaccurate" date on works of Eraclius Later in the medieval period, the son of Anthony of Pisa, artist and instructor Cennino Cennini, and, in 1556, Georgius Agricola also contributed texts with aspects of glassmaking and glassworking.

Composition, manufacture and distribution 

Prior to c. 1000, most coloured glass was of a soda-lime-silica composition. In Northern Europe soda glass was eventually almost totally superseded by potash-lime-silica glass (Forest glass). Forest glass continued to be used in stained glass for the duration of the medieval period until soda glass again began to be used in the 16th century.

The potash (K2O) found in Forest Glass was derived from wood ash. In De diversis artibus, Theophilus describes the use of beech wood as the preferred source of ash. Other plant matter, such as bracken, was also used. As well as containing potash, beech ash comprises an assortment of compounds including iron and manganese oxides, which are particularly important for generating colour in glass.

Medieval stained glass panels could be created either by the cylinder blown sheet or crown glass (window) method.

Forest glass was manufactured in Burgundy and Lorraine near the Rhein; in Flanders; and in Normandy, in the Seine and Loire Valleys. It was distributed throughout mainland north-west Europe and Britain in the form of ready-made sheets. The application of painted decoration to and final shaping of the sheets was carried out at glass working centres close by the final destination of the glass.

Colour
 

The colour of glass could be affected by many factors. Sources of silica were often impure, with iron oxide being one of the most common impurities. The greenish hue of uncoloured glass is usually owing to the presence of a mixture of ferrous (Fe2+) and ferric (Fe3+) ions in the glass matrix. It is also possible that 'impurities' could be introduced at the fritting stage within the glass furnace, leading to the addition of further alumina, silica and iron oxides.

Inherent colour

Inherent colour refers to the colours that may be formed in the molten glass by manipulating the furnace environment. Theophilus describes molten glass changing to a "saffron yellow colour" which will eventually transform to a reddish yellow on further heating, he also refers to a "tawny colour, like flesh" which, upon further heating will become "a light purple" and later "a reddish purple, and exquisite".

These colour changes are the result of the behaviour, under redox conditions, of the iron and manganese oxides which are naturally present in beech wood ash.

In the glass melt the iron and manganese behave as follows:

 
In an oxidising environment metal (and some non-metal) ions will lose electrons. In iron oxides, Fe2+ (ferrous) ions will become Fe3+ (ferric) ions. In molten glass this will result in a change in glass colour from pale blue to yellow/brown. In a reducing environment the iron will gain electrons and colour will change from yellow/brown to pale blue. Similarly manganese will change in colour depending on its oxidation state. The lower oxidation state of manganese (Mn2+) is yellow in common glass while the higher oxidation states (Mn3+ or higher) is purple. A combination of the two states will give a pink glass.

As the manganese and iron may each be in different states of oxidation, the combination of the two can result in a broad range of attractive colours. Manganese in its fully oxidised state, if not present in too great a mass, will also act as a decolourant of glass if the iron is in its yellow, ferric form. The two colours in effect cancel each other out to produce a clear glass.

Experimental manufacture of potash glass emulating Theophilus' recipes has resulted in colours ranging from colourless to yellow, amber, brown, green, blue, pink and purple. Variation in colour hue and depth would also probably be affected by the source of the beech wood ash, depending on the soil chemistry where the beech tree grew, the age of the tree and the climate conditions.
 
Some of the stronger reds, blues and greens that are a feature of medieval stained glass rely on the addition of copper oxides.

Deliberately added colourants

Heraclius' De coloribus et artibus Romanorum includes instructions for creating green and red glass by adding copper (probably in the form of ore or copper filings) to the batch, a method practiced since ancient times.  (The chapters on how to make red, green and blue glass are missing from De diversis artibus.)
As with the iron/manganese colours, the colours formed by the addition of copper oxide to the glass are dependent on the different oxidation states of the added copper. In an oxidising environment blue cupric (Cu2+) ions are formed, in a strongly reducing environment red colloidal cuprous (Cu1+) oxide is formed and if reoxidised then green cuprous (Cu1+) oxide results.

The production of bright reds and blues in particular was straightforward, as the addition of copper to the mix resulted in the reliable creation of red, blue and green. The dominance of red and blue in Romanesque and Gothic glass is obvious. However, at York Minster, for example, it was demonstrated that 90% of the medieval glass was coloured by means of iron/manganese content.

Medieval blue soda glass

Early medieval glass was soda-based, and although the use of soda glass in Northern Europe was almost wholly superseded by forest glass after c. 1000, there are some examples of a richly coloured blue glass (identified through XRF analysis) that was produced in the medieval period using soda as the alkali. In the UK, a considerable quantity of blue soda glass has been identified in stained glass from York Minster, and in excavations at Old Sarum and Winchester. In France, in Chartres Cathedral and St Denis in Paris, soda glass has also been found, and no doubt there must be many other examples.

Evidence of recycling Roman tesserae to produce window glass in the 9th century has been identified at the Benedictine Monastery of San Vincenzo, Molise, Italy. Theophilus, in the 12th century, was also aware of such practice. He states that mosaic tesserae: 'little square stones' from 'ancient pagan buildings' along with 'various small vessels in the same colours' could be used to produce glass: 'they even melt the blue in their furnaces, adding a little of the clear white to it, and they make from it blue glass sheets which are costly and very useful in windows.' According to Theophilus, the French were particularly skilled at this process.

Cox suggests that the examples analysed at York could indeed be 'Roman, or slightly later, glass re-melted in France and imported into England'.

Flashing
Glass comprising multiple layers of clear and (usually) red glass was known to exist in the 12th and 13th centuries. The manufacturing process is not known. Flashing was developed in the 15th century, and refers to the superimposition of a thin layer of coloured glass onto another coloured or uncoloured glass sheet. The procedure may have involved dipping a small sphere of molten glass into a molten uncoloured glass and blowing this into a cylinder form (the cylinder blown sheet process) which was then cut into sections and flattened in an annealing oven. Red, or ruby, copper-based glass, is usually flashed as the colour is too dense to be used alone. Other glass colours may also be flashed. These techniques could be remarkably sophisticated as demonstrated by 15thc. glass from the Carthusian Monastery of Pavia, where layered glasses of blue and violet; green and uncoloured; and red and uncoloured have been identified.

Applied paint and silver stain

Paint
The paint applied to glass was a type of enamel, usually dark brown or black, formed from a mixture of: ground copper or iron oxide; powdered glass; wine, urine or vinegar; and gum arabic. other recipes could include sugar, treacle or vegetable oil. This 'paint' was applied in a series of washes, with fine details added last. Both the external and internal faces of the glass could be painted, adding depth to the overall composition. The enamel was fixed by 'firing' the glass in an annealing oven.

Silver stain
Producing a strong clear yellow could be difficult in early stained glass as it relied upon the careful control of furnace conditions in order to create the appropriate reducing or oxidising environment. The introduction of silver stain in the early 14th century not only provided a solution to this difficulty, but also allowed greater flexibility in the way in which colour could be used. The first datable example of the use of silver stain is in the parish church of Le Mesnil-Villeman, Manche, France (1313). Silver stain was a combination of silver nitrate or silver sulphide blended with pipe clay and applied to (usually) clear glass. This technique enabled a more flexible approach to glass painting, allowing, for example, the hair of a figure to be painted on the same piece of glass as the head. It was also used to highlight details of canopywork or grisaille, and later it was added to the surface of coloured glass, to create a wider variety of glass hues.

See also
French Gothic stained glass windows
English Gothic stained glass windows
Stained glass conservation
British and Irish stained glass (1811–1918)
Medieval stained glass in Sweden

References

Bibliography

Azzoni, C. B., Di Martino, D., Marchesi, V., Messiga. B., Riccardi, M. P., (2005). Colour Attributes of Medieval Window Panes: Electron Paramagnetic Resonance and Probe Microanalyses on Stained Glass Windows from Pavia Carthusian Monastery. Archaeometry 47/2, 381–388.
Cox, G. A., Gillies, K. J. S., 1986. The X-Ray Fluorescence Analysis of Medieval Durable Blue Soda Glass from York Minster. Archaeometry, 28/1, 57–68.
Cramp, R. J., 1975. Window Glass From the Monastic Site of Jarrow: Problems of Interpretation. Journal of Glass Studies, 17, 88–96.
Davison, S., 2003. Conservation and Restoration of Glass. Oxford: Butterworth-Heinemann.
Freestone, I. 1992. Theophilus and the Composition of Medieval Glass, Materials Issues in Art and Archaeology III, Pittsburgh, Pennsylvania: Materials Research Society, 739–745.
Hawthorne, J. G., Smith, C. S. (eds), 1979.Theophilus: On Divers Arts. New York: Dover.
Henderson, J. 1992. Early medieval glass technology: the calm before the storm. In S. Jennings and A. Vince (eds) Medieval Europe 1992: Volume 3 Technology and Innovation, 175–179.
Heyworth, M., 1992. Evidence for Early Medieval Glass Working. In S. Jennings and A. Vince (eds) Medieval Europe 1992: Volume 3 Technology and Innovation, 169–174.
Marks, R., 1993. Stained Glass in England During the Middle Ages. London: Routledge.
Newton, R., and Davison, S., 1997, Conservation of Glass, Butterworth–Heinemann, Oxford.
Royce-Roll, D., 1994. The Colors of Romanesque Stained Glass. Journal of Glass Studies,36, 71–80.
Smedley, J., W., Jackson, C. M., Booth, C.A., 1998. Back to the Roots: The Raw Materials, Glass Recipes and Glassmaking Practices of Theophilus. In: McCray, P. (ed). The Prehistory and History of Ancient Glassmaking, 145–165.
Stern, W. B., and Gerber, Y., 2004, Potassium-Calcium Glass: New Data and Experiments. Archaeometry 46/1, 137–156.

Further reading

History of glass
Stained glass
Glass art
Technology in the Middle Ages
Medieval architecture